An Evening with Sutton Foster: Live at the Café Carlyle is the second solo album and the first live album of actress and singer Sutton Foster, released through Ghostlight Records on March 15, 2011. The album was recorded during her An Evening with Sutton Foster tour (2010-11).

Track listing
"I'm Beginning to See the Light" by Duke Ellington, Don George, Johnny Hodges, and Harry James
Dialog #1- Introductions
"Not for the Life of Me" from Thoroughly Modern Millie/"NYC" from Annie/"Astonishing" from Little Women
Dialog #2- "Up on the Roof" Intro
"Up on the Roof" by Carole King and Gerry Goffin
"Air Conditioner" by Christine Lavin
"Warm All Over" from The Most Happy Fella
Dialog #3- Angel Cards
"Show Off" from The Drowsy Chaperone
"More to the Story" from Shrek (cut from the show)
"My Heart Was Set on You" by Jeff Blumenkrantz
"Down with Love" from Hooray for What!
"I Like the Sunrise" by Duke Ellington
Dialog #4- Ho Cup Surprise
"Defying Gravity" from Wicked
"The Late, Late Show" by Dave Cavanaugh and Roy Alfred
Dialog #5- Jeopardy
"Sunshine on My Shoulders" by John Denver
"Anyone Can Whistle" from Anyone Can Whistle/"Being Alive" from Company
Dialog #6- Thank Yous
"Come the Wild, Wild Weather" by Noël Coward
"Here, There and Everywhere" by John Lennon & Paul McCartney
Dialog #7- Encore
"And I Am Telling You I'm Not Going" from Dreamgirls

Reception

The album received generally positive reviews from consumers and critics alike, and has 4.8 out of 5 stars on Amazon. Stephen Holden said, "The radiance of Julia Roberts and the zany spunk of Holly Golightly: that only begins to describe the seductive charms of Sutton Foster in her irresistible cabaret show, An Evening With Sutton Foster."

Personnel
Vocals – Sutton Foster
Arrangements – Michael Rafter
Musical Director – Michael Rafter
Piano – Michael Rafter
Guitar – Kevin Kuhn

2011 live albums